, originally  and later , is a Japanese multinational manufacturing company for cycling components, fishing tackle and rowing equipment, who also produced golf supplies until 2005 and snowboarding gear until 2008. Named after founder Shozaburo  Shimano (1894–1958) and headquartered in Sakai, Osaka Prefecture, the company has 32 consolidated and 11 unconsolidated subsidiaries, with the primary manufacturing plants based in Kunshan (China), Malaysia and Singapore.

In 2017, Shimano had net sales of US $3.2 billion, 38% in Europe, 35% in Asia, and 11% in North America. Bicycle components represented 80%, fishing tackle 19%, and other products 0.1%.  The company is publicly traded, with 93 million shares of common stock outstanding.

They are also the official neutral support for most of the UCI World Tour.

Cycling 
Shimano sales constitute an estimated 70–80% of the global bicycle component market by value. Its products include drivetrain, brake, wheel and pedal components for road, mountain, track and hybrid bikes. The components include cranksets comprising cranks and chainrings; bottom brackets; chains; rear chain sprockets and cassettes; front and rear wheel hubs; gear shift levers; brakes; brake levers; cables; front and rear dérailleurs. Shimano Total Integration (STI) is Shimano's integrated shifter and brake lever combination for road bicycles. The Italian firm Campagnolo as well as US based SRAM are Shimano's primary competitors in the cycling marketplace.

When the 1970s United States bike boom exceeded the capacity of the European bicycle component manufacturers, Japanese manufacturers SunTour and Shimano rapidly stepped in to fill the void. While both companies provided products for all price-ranges of the market, SunTour also focused on refinement of existing systems and designs for higher-end products, while Shimano initially paid more attention to rethinking the basic systems and bringing out innovations such as Positron shifting (a precursor to index shifting) and front freewheel systems at the low end of the market. In the 1980s, with Shimano pushing technological innovation and lower prices, the more traditional European component manufacturers lost significant market presence. During this period, in contrast to the near-universal marketing technique of introducing innovations on the expensive side of the marketplace and relying on consumer demand to emulate early adopters along with economy of scale to bring them into the mass market, Shimano and SunTour (to a lesser extent) introduced new technologies at the lowest end of the bicycle market, using lower cost and often heavier and less durable materials and techniques, only moving them further upmarket if they established themselves in the lower market segments.

In the 1980–1983 period, Shimano introduced three groupsets with "AX" technology: Dura-Ace & 600 (high-end), and Adamas in the low-end. Features of these components include aerodynamic styling, center-pull brakes, brake levers with concealed cables, and ergonomic pedals. By 1985 Shimano introduced innovation only at the highest quality level (Dura-Ace for road bikes and XT for mountain bikes), then trickled the technology down to lower production levels as it became proven and accepted. Innovations include index shifting (known as SIS, Shimano Index System introduced in 1984),  freehubs, dual-pivot brakes, 8-9-10 speed drivetrains, and the integration of shifters and brake levers. Also, these components could only work properly when used with other Shimano components; for example, its rear derailleurs have to be used with the correct Shimano gear levers, cables, freehub, and cassette. SunTour tried to catch up, but by the end of the 1980s they had lost the technological and commercial battle, and Shimano had become the largest manufacturer of bicycle components in the world.

Shimano's marketplace domination that developed in the 1990s quickly led to the perception by some critics that Shimano had become a marketplace bully with monopolistic intentions. This viewpoint was based on the fact that Shimano became oriented towards integrating all of their components with each other, with the result being that if any Shimano components were to be used, then the entire bike would need to be built from matching Shimano components. The alternative perspective is that by controlling the mix of components on the bicycle, a manufacturer such as Shimano can control how well their own product functions. Shimano's primary competitors (Campagnolo and SRAM) also make proprietary designs that limit the opportunity to mix and match componentry.

In 2003 Shimano introduced "Dual Control" to mountain bikes, where the gear shift mechanism is integrated into the brake levers. This development was controversial, as the use of Dual Control integrated shifting for hydraulic disc brakes required using Shimano hydraulic disc brakes, locking competitors out of the premium end of the market. However, with their 2007 product line, Shimano moved back to making separate braking and shifting components fully available in addition to the integrated "Dual Control" components, a move to satisfy riders that wished to use Shimano shifting with other brands of disc brakes.

Shimano in 1990 introduced the Shimano Pedaling Dynamics (SPD) range of clipless pedals and matching shoes, designed so that the shoes could be used for walking. The shoes have a recess in the bottom of the sole for fitting the smaller cleats and therefore it does not protrude, while conventional clipless road pedals are designed for road cycling shoes that have smooth soles with large protruding cleats, which are awkward for walking. The SPD range, in addition to other off-road refinements, was designed to be used with treaded soles that more closely resemble rugged hiking boots. SPD pedals and shoes soon established themselves as the market standard in this sector, although many other manufacturers have developed alternatives that may be less prone to being clogged by mud or easier to adjust. However, the SPD dominance in this sector has meant that alternative pedal manufacturers nearly always design their pedals to be usable with Shimano shoes, and likewise mountain bike shoe manufacturers make their shoes "Shimano SPD" compatible. SPD has spawned 2 types of road cleats that are incompatible with standard SPD pedals and some shoes – SPD-R and SPD-SL. SPD-R is a now-defunct pedal standard. SPD-SL is basically a copy of the standard Look clipless pedal system. It has a wide, one-sided platform and a triangular cleat that is Look 3-bolt compatible.

Shimano products

Results
Alexi Grewal used a bicycle equipped with Shimano DynaDrive chainset and pedals (the remainder of the components on his bicycle were primarily Suntour and DiaCompe) to win the 1984 Olympic road race in Los Angeles.  In the 1988 Giro d'Italia, Andrew Hampsten rode Shimano to its first Grand Tour victory.  In 2002, world championships in both the road and time trial disciplines were won on Shimano equipment. Alberto Contador's 2007 victory in the Tour de France on a Shimano-equipped bicycle represents the first official General Classification victory in that race by a rider using Shimano components (Lance Armstrong originally won the TDF with Shimano in 1999 but was later disqualified due to drug use).

VIA
"VIA" ("Vehicle Inspection Association") is stamped on all Shimano parts. It is an official approval stamp used to certify parts of Japanese vehicles – including bicycles. This mark signifies compliance with certain quality standards.

Road groupsets

Mountain groupsets
The first Shimano MTB groupset was Deore XT in 1983. It was based on a 1981 Deore derailleur built for touring.

Mountain bike groupsets include:

Other groupsets
Other current and previous groupsets include:

Capreo [F700] – Groupset designed for small-wheeled bikes such as folders and features a cassette with a 9-tooth sprocket.
DXR [MX70] – Performance BMX racing component.
Nexave [C810] – Several sub-groupsets are designed for comfort and commuting bikes, some of which feature internal hub gears and roller brakes.
Tourney - Lowest-end groupset, a mix of inexpensive components including 6-, 7- and 8 speed.
Zee [M640] - Lower-priced version of Saint, SLX-performance level.
GRX [RX800/RX600/RX400] - Gravel cycling specific groupsets intended to be compatible with road groupsets and mountain cassettes.

Groupsets no longer offered include:

Santé - 1987 (Shimano 5000 : 7 Speed) Positioned between Dura Ace and Ultegra 600. Characterized by white paint scheme. 
Exage Action, Exage Sport, Exage Motion - 1988 (Shimano A450) 
RX100 - 1990 (Shimano A550) Comparable to Tiagra 
RSX  -1995 (Shimano A410) Positioned below RX100. Replaced by Sora. 
70GS and 100GS - budget groupsets in 1990-1992
Hone (M600 : 9 speed) – discontinued in 2008
Metrea [U5000] – Groupset designed for urban riding, promising reliable performance with clean, simplistic design. Introduced in 2015 and discontinued in 2020.

Fishing 
Shimano offers a range of fishing tackles including reels, rods, lines, lures, as well as various fishing accessories, apparels and electronics. Their spinning reels are their best-selling product series in the world.

Manufacturing
Shimano has 13,000 employees (2017). Shimano runs fabrications in Argentina, Australia, China, Germany, India, Indonesia, Japan, Malaysia, Mexico, the Philippines, Singapore, Taiwan, Thailand, the United Kingdom, the United States and Vietnam.

Partnerships
Shimano is a founding member of the Global Alliance for EcoMobility, an international partnership that works to promote EcoMobility and thus reduce citizens’ dependency on private motorized vehicles worldwide. The EcoMobility Alliance was founded by a group of leading global organizations on the occasion of the Climate Change Conference in Bali in December 2007.

Financial results

See also 

 Comparison of hub gears
 Daiwa

References

External links

 
 History of Dura-Ace and Compatibility at Sheldonbrown.com
 Cycling components specifications and compatibility charts, from 2004 to current

Companies based in Osaka Prefecture
Companies listed on the Tokyo Stock Exchange
Cycle parts manufacturers
Fishing equipment manufacturers
Japanese brands
Japanese companies established in 1921
Manufacturing companies established in 1921
Manufacturing companies of Japan
Midori-kai
Sporting goods manufacturers of Japan
Sportswear brands